Tangyuan County is a county in the east of Heilongjiang province, China. It is the westernmost county-level division of the prefecture-level city of Jiamusi.

Administrative divisions 
Tangyuan County is divided into 4 towns and 6 townships. 
4 towns
 Xianglan, Heli, Zhulian, Tangyuan
6 townships
 Tangwang, Shengli, Jixiang, Zhenxing, Taipingchuan, Yongfa

Demographics 

Climate

Notes and references

External links 
  Government site - 

Tangyuan